This is a list of Chinese-style gardens both within China and elsewhere in the world.

Greater China
This list is organized by region within the Greater China region, roughly following the structure laid out by Maggie Keswick in The Chinese Garden. The names of Chinese gardens are very problematic in English; this list aims to capture all the major variants, both in Chinese and in English.

North China
 Beijing area
 Da Guan Yuan (Prospect Garden)
 Ning Shou Yuan (Garden of the Qianlong Emperor; Garden of Tranquil Longevity)
 Qu Yuan (Garden on Harmonious Interest)
 Yu Hua Yuan (Imperial Palace Garden)
 Taoranting Park (Carefree Pavilion Garden)
 Zi Zhu Yuan (purple Bamboo Garden)

East China

 Shexian
 Xin'an Bei Yuan (Xin'an Garden of Stelai)
 Suzhou
 He Yuan (Crane Garden)
 Qushui Garden
 Xi Yuan (Western Garden)
 Jiangsu
 Yangzhou
 Ping Shan Tang (Hall Level with the Mountains)
 Pian Shi Shan Fang (Sliver of Rock Mountain Cottage)

West China
 Xi'an
 Huaqing Pool

Southwest China

 Sichuan
 Chengdu
 Du Fu Cao Tang (Thatched Hut of Du Fu)
 Yunnan
 Kunming
 Cui Hu (翠湖公园; "Green Lake Park"; 20th century)

South China

 Guangdong
 Guangzhou
 Baomo Yuan (宝墨园; "Bao Zheng's Inkstone Garden"; late Qing, destroyed 1957, rebuilt 1995; 6.66ha)
 Lan Pu (兰圃; "Orchid Nursery"; 1957; 3.9ha)
 Nanyue Yuan (南粤苑; "Southern Yue Garden"; 2009; 6.66ha)
 Yu Yin Shan Fang (余荫山房; "Mountain Cottage of Abundant Shade"; 1867; 0.16ha)
 Dongguan
 Ke Yuan (可園; "Satisfying Garden"; 1850; 0.54ha)
 Foshan
 Liang Yuan (梁园; "Garden of the Liang Family"; 1840; 2.1ha), also known as the Qun Xing Caotang ("Thatched Hut of the Assembled Stars")
 Shunde
 Qing Hui Yuan (清晖园; "Garden of Pure Splendor"; 1800; 0.8ha)
 Zhongshan
 Zhan Yuan (詹园; "Zhan's Garden"; 1998)

 Macau
 Lou Lim Ieoc Garden
 Comendador Ho Yin Garden

 Hong Kong
 Hang Hau Man Kuk Lane Park
 Hollywood Road Park (荷李活道公園)
 Kowloon Park (partial)
 Kowloon Walled City Park (九龍寨城公園)
 Lai Chi Kok Park
 Lok Kwan Street Park
 Nan Lian Garden (南蓮園池)
 Sha Tin Park (沙田公園)

Taiwan
 Hsinchu
 Nanyuan
Taichung
Wufeng Lin Family Mansion and Garden
 Tainan
 Tainan Wu Garden
 Taipei
 Taipei Botanical Garden
 Zhishan Garden in National Palace Museum
 Lin Family Mansion and Garden()
 Shuangxi Park and Chinese Garden
 Shilin Official Residence

Outside Greater China

Asia
Japan
Enchoen, Yurihama, Tottori, Japan
Fukushūen (Fuzhou Garden) in Naha, Okinawa, Japan

Philippines
Chinese Garden, Rizal Park in Manila, Philippines

Singapore
Chinese Garden, Singapore in Singapore

Australasia

Australia
Chinese Garden of Friendship in Chinatown, Sydney, Australia

New Zealand
Dunedin Chinese Garden in Dunedin, New Zealand
Scholar's Chinese Garden in Hamilton, New Zealand
https://hamiltongardens.co.nz/collections/paradise-collection/chinese-scholars-garden/

Europe
Germany
Chinesischer Garten in Frankfurt, Germany
Chinesischer Garten in Berlin, Germany
Der Chinesische Garten in Mannheim, Germany
Qian Yuan in the Botanischer Garten der Ruhr-Universität Bochum, Bochum, Germany
Garten der schönen Melodie in Stuttgart, Germany

Netherlands
Hortus Haren in Haren, Groningen

Malta
Chinese Garden of Serenity in Santa Luċija, Malta

Switzerland
Chinese Garden, Zürich, Switzerland

United Kingdom
Woburn Abbey, Bedfordshire
Tatton Park, Cheshire
Fanhams Hall, Hertfordshire
Kew Gardens, London
Biddulph Grange, Staffordshire
Beggar's Knoll, Wiltshire

North America
Canada
The Chinese Garden at the Montréal Botanical Garden in Montreal, Quebec, Canada
Dr. Sun Yat-Sen Classical Chinese Garden in Vancouver, BC, Canada

United States
The New York Chinese Scholar's Garden 寄興園 in Staten Island, New York
Lan Su Chinese Garden in Portland, Oregon
Liu Fang Yuan 流芳園 or the Garden of Flowing Fragrance, Chinese Garden at the Huntington Library in San Marino, California 
Seattle Chinese Garden in Seattle, Washington
The Astor Court in the Metropolitan Museum of Art in New York
The Margaret Grigg Nanjing Friendship Garden in the Missouri Botanical Garden in St. Louis, Missouri
Robert D. Ray Asian Gardens in Des Moines, Iowa
Innisfree Garden in Millbrook, New York
Pagoda & Oriental Garden in Norfolk, Virginia

See also 
Chinese garden
List of botanical gardens in China
List of Japanese gardens in the United States

References

 
Chinese